Grace Latoya Hamilton (born 6 August 1982), known professionally as Spice, is a Jamaican dancehall recording artist, singer, songwriter and businesswoman. Often cited as the "Queen of Dancehall", Spice is recognised as one of the most prominent dancehall artists in the world.

Beginning her career in the early 2000s, Spice had her first major success with the controversial single "Romping Shop" with Vybz Kartel in 2009. She subsequently signed with VP Records, and released her debut EP, So Mi Like It (2014), which was preceded by the single of the same name. In 2018, she joined the cast of VH1's reality television series Love & Hip Hop: Atlanta in season seven, after appearing as a guest star in season six.

Spice's first full-length project, a mixtape titled Captured (2018), was released independently and debuted at number one on the Billboard Reggae Albums chart. Her long-delayed debut studio album, 10 (2021), was nominated for Best Reggae Album at the 64th Grammy Awards in 2022. Following her departure from VP, she independently released her second studio album, Emancipated (2022).

Early life
Grace Latoya Hamilton was born in Spanish Town, St. Catherine, Jamaica and raised in Portmore. Her father died when she was nine years old. As a child, she used to attend her church regularly and lead the choir. She spent part of her childhood living with her grandparents in Finsbury Park, London, where she also attended school before returning to Jamaica. While a student in St. Catherine High School, she frequently participated in the Jamaica Cultural Development Commission (JCDC) festival in the music category and earned several medals throughout the years. Although she wanted to become a chartered accountant, she decided to pursue a music career. Following that, she enrolled at the Edna Manley College of the Visual and Performing Arts to study music and drama. She then began experimenting with dancehall music and soon after generated interest in her community and its environs with her deejaying abilities at local stage shows.

Career

2000–2007: Career beginnings
Spice made her debut when she was given the opportunity to perform at the annual dancehall festival Sting in 2000. It was her first major appearance on a stage show, where she earned several encores from the crowd. During this early stage of her career, Spice went on to gain a reputation for her performing abilities, despite not having any hit record.

While on tour in the UK, Spice earned the attention of Baby Cham, who later introduced her to renowned record producer Dave Kelly. From there, she released her first single for Kelly's Madhouse Records label entitled "Complain", then followed by her singles on the Bad Gal riddim, "Right There" with Toi and "Hype". At that time, she was featured on Jimmy Cliff's "I Want I Do I Get" from his album Black Magic (2004) and on Beenie Man's "Hot" from his album Concept of Life (2006). For her first hit single, Spice used the popular Eighty Five riddim to create "Fight Over Man", which became popular in the dancehall scene. In 2007, she went on a hiatus due to the birth of her son but soon returned to performing.

2008–2012: Breakthrough and continued success
In late 2008, Spice collaborated with fellow dancehall artist Vybz Kartel on the single "Romping Shop", which samples "Miss Independent" by Ne-Yo. The song quickly achieved international recognition, receiving immense rotation on mainstream urban stations in the US. "Romping Shop" spent 15 weeks on the Billboard Hot R&B/Hip-Hop Songs chart, peaking at number 76. Shortly after its release, the song was banned by the Jamaica Broadcasting Corporation due to its explicit lyrical content. "Romping Shop" was ranked number 9 on both Pitchfork's list of the 50 Best Dancehall Songs of All Time and Billboards 12 Best Dancehall & Reggaeton Choruses of the 21st Century.

In July 2009, Spice signed a recording contract with VP Records. In 2010, she released the single "Jim Screechie". In 2011, she released a remix for her song "Fun" featuring rapper Missy Elliott and collaborated with Mýa on the single "Take Him Out" from Mýa's sixth album K.I.S.S. (Keep It Sexy & Simple). Spice also performed the song with Mýa at Reggae Sumfest that year. A music video for "Take Him Out" was released in 2012.

2013–2016: So Mi Like It and growing popularity

In April 2013, Spice released her first project as a producer, the Gal Click riddim, featuring some of her fellow female dancehall artists. She gained further recognition with her single "So Mi Like It", which was released later that year. The accompanying music video, released in January 2014, became the most viewed music video by a female Jamaican artist. A remix of "So Mi Like It" featuring rapper Busta Rhymes was later released on his mixtape Catastrophic 2.

Spice starred as Candy in her first theatrical feature film "Destiny", which was released on 2 April 2014. She also recorded the song "No Push Over" for the film's soundtrack. Her debut EP So Mi Like It, named after the single of the same name, was released on 2 December 2014. It debuted at number 14 on the Billboard Top Reggae Albums chart. The EP features five songs, including "So Mi Like It" and "Conjugal Visit" featuring Vybz Kartel. The music video for "Conjugal Visit" garnered over 2 million views on WorldStarHipHop within one day. The same month, she was featured along with soca artist Bunji Garlin on rapper ASAP Ferg's song "Jolly" from his mixtape Ferg Forever.

In May 2015, Spice released "Needle Eye", a single inspired by Shabba Ranks's 1987 single of the same name. In May 2016, she was featured alongside Jeremih on Kid Ink's single "Nasty". The following month, she released the single "Indicator", based on a dance move of the same name. For 2016's Red Bull Culture Clash, she joined forces with Mixpak and won the clash over Wiz Khalifa & Taylor Gang and others. At the MOBO Awards, Spice was the only female nominated for Best Reggae Act and the first female dancehall artist ever nominated in this category.

2017–2019: Love & Hip Hop: Atlanta, skin whitening controversy and Captured
In April 2017, Spice released the single "Sheet". In June, she appeared on a remix of Jax Jones's "You Don't Know Me". In August, she was featured alongside Sean Kingston and Lady Leshurr on Charlie Sloth's "I Can Do" from his album The Plug. After making a guest appearance in season six of VH1's reality TV show Love & Hip Hop: Atlanta, Spice joined the show as a cast member in season seven.

After a brief social media hiatus, Spice posted a picture of herself with dramatically light skin on Instagram on 22 October 2018. The picture went viral, causing many to think she had whitened her skin. She eventually confirmed that she faked whitening her skin to raise awareness about the issue of colorism within the black community. Spice addressed the issue in her single "Black Hypocrisy", which was released the next day along with an accompanying music video. Serving as the lead single for her debut mixtape, "Black Hypocrisy" debuted at number one on the Billboard Reggae Digital Song Sales chart.

Spice's debut mixtape, Captured, was released on 2 November 2018 under her own independent record label Spice Official Entertainment. The mixtape was released following a legal dispute with her record label over the release of her long-delayed debut album. Captured debuted at number one on the Billboard Reggae Albums chart. Besides "Black Hypocrisy", several tracks from the project such as "Romantic Mood", "Cool It" and "Genie", were also highlighted with accompanying music videos.

In October 2019, Spice appeared with Sean Paul on the remix of Stylo G's "Dumpling", which peaked at number three on the Billboard Reggae Digital Song Sales chart. The same month, she released the single "Tables Turn". In November, she was featured on Krept and Konan's track "First Time" alongside Tory Lanez. "First Time" became her first entry on the UK Singles Chart, where it debuted at number 63.

2020–present: 10 and Emancipated
In March 2020, Spice announced the release of her debut studio album, which was executively produced by Shaggy. Its lead single, "Frenz", was released to streaming platforms on 18 December 2020. "Go Down Deh", featuring Shaggy and Sean Paul, was released as the album's second lead single on 30 April 2021. Its accompanying music video quickly amassed millions of views, with the song becoming a success on streaming platforms. "Go Down Deh" was ranked number 48 on NPR Music's list of the 100 Best Songs of 2021. Spice's debut studio album, 10, was eventually released on 6 August 2021, debuting at number six on the Billboard Reggae Albums chart. It was nominated for Best Reggae Album at the 64th Grammy Awards in 2022. 

In November 2021, Shaggy confirmed Spice's departure from VP Records. Following that, she announced the release of her second studio album, Emancipated. Its lead single, "Clap Clap", was released on 22 July 2022. On 25 August 2022, Spice shared via Twitter a short snippet of the uncensored music video for "Tape Measure", the album's second single, which quickly went viral. Emancipated was released on 26 August 2022, debuting at number seven on the Billboard Reggae Albums chart. The same month, she was featured alongside Capella Grey on Karlie Redd's single "Werk", and on Stefflon Don's "Clockwork". In September, she collaborated with Nigerian singer Yemi Alade on the single "Bubble It". In October, she appeared on Skeng and Nicki Minaj's remix of "Likkle Miss" called "THE FINE NINE REMIX".

Business ventures
In 2009, Spice launched her clothing boutique chain Spicey Couture in Jamaica. The chain had branches in Kingston, May Pen and Montego Bay. As of 2020, the chain is no longer active.

In 2010, Spice opened a beauty salon called Spicey Salon in Kingston. She also opened a sports bar and lounge called 8 Ball in her hometown of Portmore.

In May 2019, Spice launched Faces & Laces, an online beauty store that initially offered a line of wigs. Later that year, cosmetic products were added to the beauty line.

In October 2020, Spice launched her clothing line called Graci Noir.

Philanthropy
In 2016, Spice launched a back-to-school sponsorship competition via Instagram. Fans were asked to remix one of Spice's songs in an educational way for a chance to earn an all-expense-paid scholarship. The scholarship included fully paid tuition, fully covered book list, uniforms and school supplies. The winner was selected based on the highest number of likes for the remix.

In 2018, Spice founded the Grace Hamilton Women Empowerment Foundation (GHWEF), which aims to enrich women through education, business and entrepreneurship. In August 2019, Spice hosted a back-to-school giveaway in Kingston through the foundation, providing school supplies to more than 500 children.

Personal life
In 2009, Spice became engaged to her boyfriend Nicholas Lall, whom she had been dating since 2006. The couple called off the engagement and ended their relationship in 2016. They have two children, a son born in 2007 and a daughter born in 2011.

In 2020, Spice began dating American cinematographer Justin Budd, whom she met in Atlanta. The couple ended their relationship in 2022.

DiscographyStudio albums'
 10 (2021)
 Emancipated (2022)

Filmography

Awards and nominations

References

External links

 
 
 
 

1982 births
Living people
People from Saint Catherine Parish
Jamaican dancehall musicians
Jamaican reggae musicians
Jamaican singer-songwriters
21st-century Jamaican women singers
Reggae fusion artists
Participants in American reality television series
VP Records artists